The Icelandic Socialist Party (SFÍ) is a socialist political party in Iceland, which was founded on International Workers' Day (1 May) in 2017.

History 
According to Gunnar Smári the party already had 1,400 members at its foundation. At the beginning of May, a temporary board was selected at a meeting to prepare a "Socialist Congress" in the autumn of 2017. Prior to the Congress the party selected four committees among its members by sortition, responsible for healthcare, housing, social welfare, and democratization of society.

The party did not contest the 2017 Althing elections, as it declared itself to be in a "build-up phase", but ran lists in Reykjavík and Kópavogur municipalities in the municipal elections on 26 May 2018. In Reykjavík, they received one of 23 seats with 6.4% of the vote.

Ideology and policies 
The architect behind the party is the editor and author Gunnar Smári, who at the launching of the party declared that it should be "an advocate for wage earners and all those who are poor, invisible and powerless. The opponents of the Icelandic Socialist Party are the rich and those who serve their interests". The main points in the party platform are:
 "Humane living conditions" with regard to wages, unemployment benefits, pensions and student loans. 
 A free healthcare system with no additional payments.
 Shorter working hours.  
 A reform of the tax system with higher taxes for the wealthy and lower taxes for wage earners.

Parliamentary elections

Reykjavík City Council elections

References

External references 
 Official website (in English)
 Official Facebook account 

2017 establishments in Iceland
Socialist parties in Iceland